See "service record" for other countries version of the personnel file
A military personnel file (also called a 201 file in the United States Army) is a set of documents maintained by the US government for members of the United States armed forces.  201 files usually contain documents describing the member's military and civilian education history.  A 201 file may also contain personal information such as home of record, and awards documents.  Typically, a 201 file contains one or more of the following:

 Promotion Orders
 Mobilization Orders
 DA1059s – Service School Academic Evaluation Reports
 MOS Orders
 Awards and decorations
 Transcripts
 SGLV 8286 – Servicemembers’ Group Life Insurance Election and Certificate)
 NCOERs and OERs (Evaluation Documents)
 DD Form 214 Certificate of Release or Discharge from Active Duty

The 201 file is an important document for service members to maintain, as the documents it contains are important for access to benefits such as the VA loan and the G.I. Bill.

Copies of the 201 file can also be requested from the National Archives by service members and their families.

201 file further contains demotions, forfeiture of pay as a de facto record of non-judicial disciplinary action (Article 15). 

Court Martial and judicial action are recorded. 

Weapons qualification is included in the 201 file. 

The Central Intelligence Agency also uses the term "201 File" to refer to their own personnel records used for analogous purposes.

References 

United States military policies
United States government forms